Rubén Rosquete Abreu (born 17 August 1989 in Icod de los Vinos, Tenerife) is a Spanish footballer who plays for Glassydur UD Icodense as a striker.

External links
 
 Futbolme profile 

1989 births
Living people
People from Icod de los Vinos
Sportspeople from the Province of Santa Cruz de Tenerife
Spanish footballers
Footballers from the Canary Islands
Association football forwards
Segunda División players
Segunda División B players
Tercera División players
CD Tenerife B players
CD Tenerife players
Real Murcia players